George Hockey (1 January 1905 – 27 March 1990) was an English cricketer. He played for Essex between 1928 and 1931.

References

External links

1905 births
1990 deaths
English cricketers
Essex cricketers
Cricketers from Ipswich
Suffolk cricketers